Cyclorhagida is a class of kinorhynchs, which are small marine invertebrates.

Orders and families 
 Order Echinorhagata Sørensen et al., 2015
 Echinoderidae Zelinka, 1894
 Order Kentrorhagata Sørensen et al., 2015
 Antygomonidae Adrianov & Malakhov, 1994
 Cateriidae Gerlach, 1956
 Centroderidae Zelinka, 1896
 Semnoderidae Remane, 1929
 Zelinkaderidae Higgins, 1990
 Order Xenosomata Zelinka, 1907
 Campyloderidae Remane, 1929

 Family incertae sedis
 Tubulideres Sørensen, Heiner, Ziemer & Neuhaus, 2007
 Wollunquaderes Sørensen & Thormar, 2010

References

External links 
 
 

Kinorhyncha
Protostome classes